Droopy Butt Begone! is the debut album of solo electronic artist 1-Speed Bike. The third track on this album is a remix of a Fly Pan Am song from their Sédatifs En Fréquences Et Sillons EP.

Track listing
 "The Day That Mauro Ran over Elwy Yost" – 6:30
 "Seattle/Washington/Prague 00/68/Chicago/Nixon/Reagan Circle-Fighting Machine" – 3:20
 "Yuppie Restaurant-Goers Beware Because This Song Is for the Dishwasher" – 6:45
 "Just Another Jive-Assed White Colonial Theft" – 6:20
 "Why Are All the Dogs Dying of Cancer?" – 3:35
 "My Kitchen Is Tiananmen Square" – 5:16
 "Any Movement That Forgets About Class Is a Bowel Movement" – 4:26
 untitled – 0:26

References

2000 debut albums
Constellation Records (Canada) albums